is a 1964 Japanese film based on a novel by Taijiro Tamura and directed by Seijun Suzuki.

Plot
In an impoverished and burnt out Tokyo ghetto of post-World War II Japan, a band of prostitutes defend their territory, squatting in a bombed-out building. Somehow they eke out a living together. Forming a sort of family in an environment where everyone (American soldiers and Japanese yakuza) is a potential antagonist, the girls cajole each other, and ruthlessly punish any of their group who violate the cardinal rule—no having sex for free. A new girl, Maya (Yumiko Nogawa), joins their group and learns the trade. An ex-soldier, Shintaro Ibuki (Joe Shishido), is shot nearby and holes up with the girls. Each of them starts to crave Ibuki, placing strains on the group. Maya feels it worse, seeing him as replacement for her brother (who died in Borneo). She takes him after a night of drunken revelry, and both are ostracized. Agreeing to run away together, he is shot in a double-cross, and she is left as she was at the beginning of the film—alone and hopeless.

Production

Planned as an "adult release" (Japanese films were classified by the country's film board as "general release" or "adult"), the usual pace of production at Nikkatsu (10 days pre-production, 25 days shooting, three days post-production) allowed Suzuki and his innovative production designer Takeo Kimura precious little time to construct sets to recreate post-war firebombed Tokyo. Sets were slapped together on the backlot using materials purloined from studio warehouses, and theatrical set design techniques which could compromise the film's "realism." The resulting production has been lauded for its resulting visual flair.

Most female actresses at Nikkatsu refused to work in the film due to the nudity and subject matter, so the cast's female roles were filled by actresses from outside the studio.

Cast
 Joe Shishido as Shintaro Ibuki
 Yumiko Nogawa as Borneo Maya
 Kōji Wada as Abe
 Tomiko Ishii as Roku
 Kayo Matsuo as Mino
 Misako Tominaga as Machiko
 Keisuke Noro as Ishii
 Chico Lourant as Catholic Priest
 Isao Tamagawa as Horidome
 Satoko Kasai as Komasa Sen

Other versions
There are three other film versions (1948), (1977), (1988 starring Katase Rino), and a recent 2008 TV drama series.

References

External links
 
 
Gate of Flesh: I Love in Fear an essay by Chuck Stephens at the Criterion Collection
 Gate of Flesh  at the Japanese Movie Database

1964 films
1960s erotic drama films
Films about prostitution in Japan
Films directed by Seijun Suzuki
Japanese erotic drama films
1960s Japanese-language films
Nikkatsu films
Films based on Japanese novels
1960s Japanese films